Macur is a surname. Notable people with the surname include:

 Andrzej Macur (born 1959), Polish sport shooter
 Julia Macur (born 1957), British judge
 Juliet Macur, American journalist
 Julita Macur (born 1959), Polish sport shooter

See also
 

Polish-language surnames